Lierna Castle is a castle on the eastern side of Lake Como in Lombardy, Italy. The castle is built on a peninsula that protrudes into the lake and consists of a group of connected buildings, rather than a single building. The main portion of the current buildings was constructed in the 10th century in Romanesque style upon former Roman ruins. The castle includes the 11th-century church of Saints Maurice and Lazarus (Chiesa dei Santi Maurizio e Lazzaro), associated with the Order of Saints Maurice and Lazarus.

The castle is occupied by the people of the frazione of Castello in the comune of Lierna. It is the northwesternmost of the eleven frazioni of Lierna comune.

History
The last military use of the castle was in the mid-16th century by Gian Giacomo Medici, known as "Medeghino" (the "small Medici"), who was primarily a mercenary.

References

Further reading 
 Franca Panizza, Il Castello di Lierna, Ed. Cattaneo Paolo Grafiche, Oggiono, 2003 

Castles in Lombardy
Tourism in Italy
Province of Lecco
Order of Saints Maurice and Lazarus